Adam Herbert John Dewes (born November 1996) is an English former first-class cricketer.

Dewes was born in Ascot in November 1996. He was educated at Wellington College, before going up to Durham University. While studying at Durham, he played two first-class cricket matches for Durham MCCU against Durham and Northamptonshire in 2019. Playing as a slow left-arm orthodox bowler, he took 3 wickets in his two matches. In addition to playing first-class cricket, Dewes has also played minor counties cricket for Berkshire.

References

External links

1996 births
Living people
People from Bracknell
People educated at Wellington College, Berkshire
Alumni of Durham University
English cricketers
Berkshire cricketers
Durham MCCU cricketers